The 1970 Chico State Wildcats football team represented Chico State College—now known as California State University, Chico—as a member of the Far Western Conference (FWC) during the 1970 NCAA College Division football season. Led by third-year head coach Pete Riehlman, Chico State compiled an overall record of 8–3 with a mark of 3–1 in conference play, sharing the FWC title with Cal State Hayward. The team outscored its opponents 334 to 189 for the season. The Wildcats played home games at College Field in Chico, California.

Schedule

References

Chico State
Chico State Wildcats football seasons
Northern California Athletic Conference football champion seasons
Chico State Wildcats football